Acacia Hills is a locality and small rural community in the local government area of Kentish in the North West region of Tasmania.
The 2021 census recorded a population of 729 for Acacia Hills.

Geography
The Don River, forms the south-western and western boundaries. Bonneys Tier Forest Reserve is in the south-east of the locality.

Road infrastructure
The B14 route (Sheffield Road) enters the locality from the north and exits to the west. The C150 route (Nook Road) starts at an intersection with route B14 and exits to the south.

References

Localities of Kentish Council
Towns in Tasmania